Lee Garrett (born June 30, 1943, in Mississippi) is an American rhythm and blues singer-songwriter, most famous for co-writing the classic song "Signed, Sealed, Delivered I'm Yours". He recorded a handful of solo singles during the 1960s, one of which was "I Can't Break the Habit". He had a hit in 1976 with "You're My Everything". Artists that have covered his compositions include Taka Boom, Carl Graves, Peter Frampton, Eddie Money, Jackie Moore, Marlena Shaw, The Spinners and many more. He has also been a radio show host.

Background
Garrett is a Mississippi born singer, composer and radio D.J., and a graduate of the Missouri School for the Blind.

He wrote several songs with Stevie Wonder, including the Jermaine Jackson song "Let's Get Serious" and The Spinners "It's a Shame".

Garrett worked in radio during the 1960s and 1970s.

In 1976, his solo track "You're My Everything" reached number 15 in the UK Singles Chart. Without any further chart presence, he became a one-hit wonder.

Over the years, Garrett and Wonder have mended their relationship.  During his 2007 tour, during a performance on August 30, Wonder paid tribute to Garrett by singing a medley of songs they co-created, and also introduced Garrett to the audience by acknowledging his presence at the show, and thanking him for years of friendship and support.

Garrett resides in the Portland, Oregon area (in Beaverton, a city just west of Portland) and continues to perform throughout the United States. As of 2004, he was the featured vocalist with a 1950s style rock and roll style group called the Boomer Band.

Career

1960s to 1970s
By November 1964, his single "Linda Sue" was released on the Van Dyk label. In 1965, the August 21 issue of Billboard mentioned his single on the World Artists label, "I Need Somebody" as a Hot 100 prediction.
In 1967, Garrett had a single “I can’t break the habit” released on the Harthon label, cat no. 137. The song would later find popularity on the Northern Soul scene. By August that year, Garrett who had the "9 to Midnight" show at Philadelphia's WHAT r&b station had filled position of musical director, and would still continue his show.

It was reported in the December 9, 1972 issue that Garrett having worked as an all night D.J. at WHAT-AM in Philadelphia and WLOK-AM in Memphis was seeking more work in radio.

Years later, Garrett recalled when he was working as a DJ in Detroit, he would play Johnny Cash's "A Boy Named  Sue" and Ray Stevens', "Gitarzan", reasoning that the songs being so popular, there must have been black people buying them as well. 
Hit song
According to the June 5, 1976 article in Record Mirror, 'The only colour I see is Music' Garrett came to Chrysalis because of a rumor that the label's new US office were scouting for Black American talent. Garrett was the first US signing. 

In May, 1976, Garrett had his hit with "You're My Everything. It peaked at no. 58 in the HOT 100 chart and spending 7 weeks in the UK singles chart, it peaked at no. 15. Garrett appeared on Top of the Pops in an episode which was broadcast on May 13th that year. He also made another appearance on the show on 10/06/76. The song also appears on the 	Top Of The Pops 1976 compilation released on EMI Gold in 2007.

Garrett, Lou Rawls, Mike Love and Donna Summer etc. were pictured in a small article, Basket Cases or Or is it Wicker's World in the October 16, 1976 issue of  Record Mirror. It showed musicians sitting in peacock basket chairs. The caption under Garrett's picture read, ". . . now Garret really gets into the part - he's got the throne, now what about the crown . . .?"
Album
His hit appeared on his album Heat for the Feets which also included "It's Better than Walking Out", "Heart Be Still", "How Can I Be A Man", "Broken Down D.J.", "Sad, Sad Story", "Stop that Wrong", " Love Enough For Two" and " Love Enough For Two". Musicians who played on the album included Harvey Mason, Lee Ritenour, June Millington, Tom Scott and Dave Grusin. Also around that time, Marlena Shaw had a minor hit with one of the songs, "Better than Walking Out", which Garrett had co-composed with Robert Taylor. "Heart Be Still" would be covered by artists such as Carl Graves, Jackie Moore and Frankie Valli.

1980s to 1990s
In February, 1981, Garrett's single "See the Love on Your Face" was out on American First AFRC-1492. It was given a positive review with the review calling Garrett a "a first-rate R&B crooner" and the song "Top-flight B/C fare".

In 1985, Garrett and Lloyd Chiate took Legal action against Stevie Wonder over the song "I Just Called to Say I Love You" claiming that Wonder stole the song from them. With attorney Jack Whitley representing Garrett, the claim was that Garrett and Chiate wrote the song in 1978 when staying with Wonder in a Hollywood hotel. Wonder heard the rehearsals and was give a demo on tape. The song Garrett and Chiate wrote was I "Just Called To Say". It was registered with BMI in 1979. On Garrett and Chiate's song, it had the chorus "I just called to say I love you, I just called to say I think you’re fine". Wonder's refrain had a quicker tempo and said, "I just called to say I love you, I just called to say how much I care". According to Jack Whitley, the chords were the same, and both songs were in four-four time. But Wonder's melody line was different. A 10 million dollar lawsuit was filed.<ref>AP News, 
October 8, 1985 - Singer Stevie Wonder Sued For Plagiarism by Lyn Elber</ref> In February 1990, the findings were in Wonder's favor with Garrett at some stage having come over to Wonder's side, leaving Chiate to peruse the matter.

Later years
Garrett was performing with The Boomer Band who had played Great Hall" New Years Eve 2003 at the Quinault Beach Resort & Casino in Washington state to over 900 guests. By 2004, with the Boomettes handling chorus behind him, Garrett was officially the feature vocalist with the Band which had been going since 1987.
In 2007, Garrett formed a song writing partnership with Mir German of Miriams Well, a rock band based in Portland. German and Garrett had heard about each other from friends in Portland for some time, and were encouraged to meet to consider writing together. The partnership worked and they, along with co-writer Mark Bowden, created an album called Indians And Clowns, released in 2010. Their song catalogue is well over 60 songs to date.

Garrett toured in 2011 with Miriams Well, sharing the stage for a set of Garrett's Motown hits and more contemporary tunes as well. They appeared together at the Waterfront Blues Festival in Portland in 2011.

In January 2013, The Boomer Band played at the Clambake Jazz Festival.

Denny McCaffrey covered "Better than Walking Out" which appeared on his 2014 album, Come On In''.

Discography

Albums

Singles

References

External links

Lee Garrett biography on the Boomerband website
Lee Garrett on Soul Walking site

Living people
American male singer-songwriters
American rhythm and blues singers
American rhythm and blues singer-songwriters
Blind musicians
1948 births
Chrysalis Records artists